Minnesota Golden Gophers volleyball is the NCAA Division I women's volleyball team at the University of Minnesota in Minneapolis. The program began its first season in 1972 under head coach Dee Jilek. Its current head coach is Keegan Cook, who took over the team at the conclusion of the 2022 season, following the resignation of Hugh McCutcheon. Previous coach Mike Hebert had led the Golden Gophers to every NCAA Tournament, with the exception of 1998, when he was head coach of the team. His tenure was highlighted by back-to-back NCAA Final Four appearances in 2003 and 2004. Hebert also led Minnesota the program's first Big Ten title in 2002.

Final Four appearances

2003

Even with a 13 overall tournament seed, Minnesota beat Washington in the regional final in five sets to advance to the school's first NCAA Final Four. In the national semifinals, Minnesota played top ranked and undefeated Southern California tough, but fell in three sets. Minnesota was led by Cassie Busse with 23 kills and Erin Martin with 11.

2004

The tournament's #4 overall seed, Minnesota defeated fifth-seeded Ohio State in the regional final to advance to their second straight national semifinal. Once again, they met Southern California, but the outcome was different than the previous year. Behind 18 kills from Minnesota's Erin Martin, the Golden Gophers defeated the two-time defending NCAA Champions in four sets to advance to the program's first NCAA national championship.

In the final against Stanford, Minnesota could not stop Ogonna Nnamani and struggled to find an offensive rhythm, falling in three straight sets to finish as national runners-up. Despite leaving the match against Stanford with a neck injury, Minnesota All-American libero Paula Gentil set an NCAA tournament record for digs in the NCAA tournament with 173 total in six matches.

2009

Minnesota, the 11th seed, earned its third Final Four appearance since 2003 by defeating third seeded Florida State 3–1 (25–20, 25–7, 18–25, 25–17).  This appearance marks the second time Minnesota has qualified for the Final Four via playing on its home court: "The Sports Pavilion" – the first time occurred during the 2004 tournament. Minnesota was knocked out of the national semifinals by Texas in three sets.

2015
After a frustrating 2014 season that saw the Golden Gophers miss the NCAA tournament for the first time since 1998, Minnesota started the season unranked in the AVCA preseason poll, and was picked to finish fifth in the Big Ten. Under the stewardship of Big Ten Coach of the Year and AVCA Coach of the Year Hugh McCutcheon, and led by the play of four AVCA All-Americans, Minnesota trumped all expectations, on its way to an 18–2 Big Ten conference record that was the best in its history and earned the program its second-ever Big Ten conference championship, the first one since 2002. The Golden Gophers entered the NCAA Tournament with a 26–4 record that earned them the top seed in their bracket and the No. 2 overall seed. After dropping just one set in regional play, Minnesota arrived at the Final Four in Omaha, Nebraska, where it lost in the national semifinals to the Texas Longhorns.

2016
Minnesota lost 3–1 to eventual national champion Stanford in the 2016 NCAA semifinals.  Minnesota had been ranked #1 in the final AVCA regular-season poll, but were seeded #2 going into the tournament, behind #1 Nebraska.

2019
As the overall #7 seed in the tournament, Minnesota advanced to its sixth Final Four in program history with a 3-0 sweep of unseeded Louisville. As in 2016, Minnesota lost to eventual national champion Stanford in the 2019 NCAA semifinals.

All-Americans

A list of first, second, third team and honorable mention AVCA All-American volleyball players.

1996 – Katrien DeDecker (1st team)
1999 – Nicole Branagh (2nd team)
2000 – Nicole Branagh (2nd team); Stephanie Hagen (2nd team)
2002 – Cassie Busse (2nd team); Paula Gentil (3rd team)
2003 – Cassie Busse (1st team); Paula Gentil (2nd team)
2004 – Kelly Bowman (1st team); Paula Gentil (1st team); Erin Martin (honorable mention)
2005 - Paula Gentil (Honorable Mention)
2006 – Meredith Nelson (2nd team)
2008 – Brook Dieter (2nd team); Lauren Gibbemeyer (3rd team)
2009 – Lauren Gibbemeyer(1st team); Taylor Carico (3rd team)
2011 – Ashley Wittman (2nd team); Tori Dixon (Honorable Mention)
2012 – Katherine Harms (1st team); Tori Dixon (2nd team); Ashley Wittman (Honorable Mention)
2013 - Tori Dixon (1st team); Ashley Wittman (2nd team); Adrianna Nora (Honorable Mention)
2014 - Paige Tapp (3rd team); Daly Santana (Honorable Mention)
2015 – Hannah Tapp (1st team); Daly Santana (1st team); Samantha Seliger-Swenson (2nd team); Paige Tapp (3rd team)
2016 - Sarah Wilhite (1st team); Samantha Seliger-Swenson (1st team); Hannah Tapp (2nd team); Alexis Hart (Honorable Mention) Molly Lohman (Honorable Mention)
2017 - Stephanie Samedy (1st team); Samantha Seliger-Swenson (2nd team); Alexis Hart (3rd team); Molly Lohman (Honorable Mention)
2018 - Stephanie Samedy (1st team); Samantha Seliger-Swenson (1st team); Regan Pittman (2nd team); Alexis Hart (Honorable Mention); Adanna Rollins (Honorable Mention); Taylor Morgan (Honorable Mention)
2019 - Stephanie Samedy (2nd team); Regan Pittman (1st team); Alexis Hart (3rd team); CC McGraw (Honorable Mention)
2020 - Stephanie Samedy (1st team); Regan Pittman (Honorable Mention); Taylor Landfair (Honorable Mention)
2021 - Stephanie Samedy (1st team); CC McGraw (Honorable Mention)
2022 - Taylor Landfair (1st team)

Season-by-season results

See also
List of NCAA Division I women's volleyball programs

References

External links